Lechenaultia heteromera, commonly known as claw leschenaultia, is a species of flowering plant in the family Goodeniaceae and is endemic to the south-west of Western Australia. It is a subshrub with a few wand-like branches, fleshy leaves, and white and pale blue flowers.

Description

Taxonomy
Lechenaultia heteromera was first formally described in 1868 by George Bentham in Flora Australiensis from specimens collected from East Mount Barren by George Maxwell. The specific epithet (heteromera) means "unequal parts", referring to the petal lobes.

Distribution and habitat
Claw leschenaultia grows in heath, scrub and woodland on the south coast of south-western Western Australia between Starvation Boat Harbour and West Mount Barren in the Esperance Plains and Mallee biogeographic regions of south-western Western Australia.

Conservation status
This leschenaultia is listed as "not threatened" by the Government of Western Australia Department of Biodiversity, Conservation and Attractions.

References

 heteromera
Plants described in 1868
Flora of Western Australia
Taxa named by George Bentham